Yogacharya Govindan Nair (Born: 1908– Died: 2001) was a noted Yoga master, author, and journalist, who made significant contributions in popularizing Yoga Asana practices amongst the people of Kerala State in India. He has authored nine books in Malayalam language. His first books was "Yogavidya" which was first published in 1982 by DC Books. Its 22nd edition was published in May 2013. Yogavidya became extremely popular amongst the Malayalam readers on account of its simple but in-depth treatment of a complex topic.  Yogavidya inspired several people and the book ran several editions and it still does. Yogavidya became one of the top three largest selling books in Malayalam in the year 1993 by selling over 10,000 copies that single year.

Yogacharya Govindan Nair was born in Kuttipuzha, near Aluva in Kerala State, India, in 1908. After secondary school education in Kuttipuzha, he travelled to Rangoon, Burma (present day Yangon in Myanmar) where he continued his education and eventually graduated in Homeopathy Medicine from Rangoon Homeopathy College . However, instead of practicing as a Homeopathy Physician, in 1937, he joined Reuters News Agency as an Editorial Assistant.  When Rangoon fell to the Japanese Army in May 1942, he escaped to India mostly walking the distance on foot. Thereafter Govindan Nair worked in the Bombay and New Delhi offices of Reuters in India.  After the independence of India from the British rule, Reuters became Press Trust of India, where Nair continued to work at various desks of PTI in India as Reporter, Editor and Bureau Chief. Nair retired from his journalistic career in 1966 at the age of 58.

He had a deep-rooted passion in Indian Vedic philosophies, occult sciences and more particularly in the disciplines of Yoga and Naturopathy from his childhood days. According to his own anecdotal narration, it was an unknown Yogi whom he had chanced to meet during a local festival, at the young age of 9,  who inspired him and silently initiated him to Yogasans.  It was a passion that had endured his long journalistic career and the hardships of two world wars and the tumultuous periods of Indian freedom struggle. He silently but steadfastly nurtured this passion throughout his career.

In the year 1968, Yogacharya Govindan Nair was diagnosed with tuberculosis. This was a major triggering point in his transformation from a journalist to that of a Yogi. After a few weeks of initial allopathic treatment, he completely stopped the medicines for tuberculosis much against the advice of his doctors.  What followed was an intensive practice of Pranayama. In about six months time, he completely healed his tuberculosis without any external medication, much to the surprise of the medical community.

Thereafter, Yogacharya Govindan Nair started teaching Yogic practices to those who were interested in healing themselves, through Yogasanas and Pranayama. He wrote articles, gave talks, conducted classes and wrote books. He was active in spreading the message of Yoga and Natural living to people from all walks of life until he died on 7 September 2001, at the age of 93.

Philosophy 
He believed that man is a part of nature; that it is our own wrong activities and our own ignorance of higher principles of life that make us diseased and ridden with sorrow. The path to perfect health is to identify and correct those errors. Disease is the shameful reflection of our anti-natural engagement with life at mental, physical and verbal levels of activity. He advocated a life founded on Yoga, Pranayama and natural living in order to restore the balance in life.

Books 
Yogavidya - (Malayalam) - A treatise on yoga philosophy and practice of Asana and Pranayama written in simple language, with ample illustrations and photographs. First published in August 1982 by D.C.Books. (. Twenty Second Edition is published in May 2013. Total Number of pages is 145.  
Aryogyavum Deerkhaayussum - (Malayalam) -  A comprehensive discussion on the ancient wisdom for health and longevity and on the ways and means to achieve it. First published in April 1985 by D.C.Books. (http://www.livehomeo.com/) . Seventh Edition (2013). Total Pages: 108. 
Yoga, Prakrithi Chikitsa - (Malayalam) -  The book discusses and proposes the integration of Natural living and practicing of Yogasans in order to restore health and vitality. First published in February 1987 by D.C.Books. (. Total Pages: 180
Hatha Pradeepika - Malayalam Translation of the Sanskrit book " Hatha Yoga Pradeepika" by swami Swatmarama, published by DC Books (.  
Yogapataavali - (Malayalam) – A syllabus based instructional manual to provide a comprehensive yoga education in 16 weeks, suitable for Yoga teachers and students. First published in July 1995 by D.C.Books. ( . Fourteenth Edition in 2013.Total Pages: 208. 
Yogabhyasa Pariseelana Padhathiyum, Soorya Namaskaravum - (Malayalam) – A simple self-help instructional manual for learning basic Yogasans as well as the 12 step-Soorya Namaskara (Sun-Salutation). First published in November 2000 by Vidyarmbham Publishers. (http://www.vidyarambham.net/). Total Pages: 100.  
Jane Eyre -  (Malayalam) Abridged retold version of Carlotte Bronte’s novel "Jane Eyre". First published by DC Books August 1983 (. Total Pages: 163
Sreemahaa Bhaagavatham - (Malayalam) Abridged prose translation of the Indian epic "Mahabharatha", first published in September 2000 by Devi Bookstall, Kodungalloor, Kerala, India. Total Pages: 184
Yogavyayamam - (Malayalam) – A quick reference book for most popular Yogasans, with photographs. . First published by Lipi Publications (Vikas Building, Link Road, Kozhikode, Kerala . 673001, India). Total Pages: 72

References

Indian yoga teachers
People from Aluva
1908 births
2001 deaths
Malayalam-language writers
Journalists from Kerala